Mugarmun District is a district (bakhsh) in Landeh County, Kohgiluyeh and Boyer-Ahmad Province, Iran. At the 2006 census, its population was 2,006, in 370 families.  The District has no city. The District has two rural districts (dehestan): Shitab Rural District and Vahdat Rural District. The district was established in 2012.

References 

Districts of Kohgiluyeh and Boyer-Ahmad Province
Landeh County
2012 establishments in Iran